The 1953 NASCAR Grand National Series began on February 1 and ended on November 1. Future NASCAR Hall of Fame driver Herb Thomas, driving his own No. 92 Hudson Hornet, won the championship and became the first repeat champion of the series. It is also the season with the most one-off races. 9 of the 37 races took place on racetracks that only held a cup race in the 1953 season.

Season recap
 Races marked with * took place exclusively in the 1953 season.

Race summaries

1953-01 

The first race of the 1953 season was run on February 1 at the Palm Beach Speedway in West Palm Beach, Florida. Dick Rathmann won the pole position.

Top ten results

42- Lee Petty
41- Jimmie Lewallen
91- Tim Flock
1- Herschel Buchanan
86- Don Oldenberg
55- Bub King
60- Dub Livingston
13- Pop McGinnis
9- Donald Thomas
67- Sam DiRusso

1953-02 

The second race of the 1953 season was run on February 15 at the Daytona Beach Road Course in Daytona Beach, Florida. Bob Pronger won the pole. Fonty Flock dominated throughout the race, leading every lap until running of fuel on the last lap. Flock was then pushed across the finish line by teammate Slick Smith. Officials ruled that this move was illegal, and Flock was awarded with second place, while Bill Blair was declared the winner.

Top ten results

2- Bill Blair
14- Fonty Flock
40- Tommy Thompson
92- Herb Thomas
91- Tim Flock
77- Dick Passwater
41- Curtis Turner
9- Donald Thomas
38- Tom Cherry
4- Slick Smith

•This was the third and final win for Blair.

1953-03 

The third race of the 1953 season was run on March 8 at Harnett Speedway in Spring Lake, North Carolina. Herb Thomas won the pole.

Top ten results

92- Herb Thomas
120- Dick Rathmann
42- Lee Petty
78- Dick Passwater
1- Herschel Buchanan
18- Mike Klapak
91- Tim Flock
24- Ray Duhigg
??- Don Oldenberg
71- Keith Hamner

Wilkes County 200 

The fourth race of the season was run on March 29 at North Wilkesboro Speedway in North Wilkesboro, North Carolina. Herb Thomas won the pole.

Top ten results

92- Herb Thomas
120- Dick Rathmann
14- Fonty Flock
42- Lee Petty
43- Jimmie Lewallen
87- Buck Baker
82- Joe Eubanks
4- Slick Smith
78- Dick Passwater
55- Bub King

1953-05 

The fifth race of the season was run on April 5 at Charlotte Speedway in Charlotte, North Carolina. Tim Flock won the pole.

Top ten results

78- Dick Passwater
51- Gober Sosebee
1- Herschel Buchanan
91- Tim Flock
13- Pop McGinnis
100- Otis Martin
19- Fred Dove
18- Mike Klapak
55- Bub King
3- Coleman Lawrence

This race stands as Passwater’s lone win out of 20 starts from 1952-53.

Richmond 200 

The sixth race of the season was run on April 19 at the Atlantic Rural Exposition Fairgrounds in Richmond, Virginia.  Buck Baker won the pole.

Top ten results

42- Lee Petty
120- Dick Rathmann
87- Buck Baker
78- Dick Passwater
2- Bill Blair
44- Ray Duhigg
9- Donald Thomas
8- Gene Comstock
19- Fred Dove
92- Herb Thomas

1953-07 

The seventh race of the season was run on April 26 at Central City Speedway in Macon, Georgia. Dick Rathmann won the pole.

Top ten results

120- Dick Rathmann
92- Herb Thomas
43- Jimmie Lewallen
14- Fonty Flock
78- Dick Passwater
91- Tim Flock
82- Joe Eubanks
87- Buck Baker
93- Ted Chamberlain
66- Virgil Livengood

1953-08 

The eighth race of the season was run on May 3 at Langhorne Speedway in Langhorne, Pennsylvania. Tim Flock captured the pole.

Top ten results

87- Buck Baker
42- Lee Petty
14- Fonty Flock
1- Herschel Buchanan
91- Tim Flock
44- Ray Duhigg
92- Herb Thomas
18- Bill Adams
46- Ralph Liguori
93- Ted Chamberlain

1953-09 

The ninth race of the season was run on May 9 at Columbia Speedway in Columbia, South Carolina. Herb Thomas won the pole.

Top ten results

87- Buck Baker
91- Tim Flock
43- Jimmie Lewallen
44- Ray Duhigg
42- Lee Petty
51- Gober Sosebee
2- Bill Blair
92- Herb Thomas
??- Bill Jennings
11- Ralph Dyer

1953-10 

The tenth race of the season was run on May 16 at Hickory Speedway in Hickory, North Carolina.  Herb Thomas won the pole.

Top ten results

91- Tim Flock
82- Joe Eubanks
44- Ray Duhigg
78- Dick Passwater
120- Dick Rathmann
??- Bob Welborn
100- Otis Martin
1- Herschel Buchanan
13- Pop McGinnis
3- Clyde Minter

1953-11 

The eleventh race of the season was run on May 17 at Martinsville Speedway in Martinsville, Virginia.  Joe Eubanks won the pole.

Top ten results

42- Lee Petty
92- Herb Thomas
120- Dick Rathmann
44- Ray Duhigg
46- Ralph Liguori
78- Dick Passwater
87- Buck Baker
45- Bob Welborn
3- Clyde Minter
98- Lyle Scott

1953-12 

The twelfth race of the season was run on May 24 at Powell Motor Speedway in Columbus, Ohio. Fonty Flock captured the pole position for the race.

Top ten results

92- Herb Thomas
120- Dick Rathmann
87- Buck Baker
41- Curtis Turner
13- Pop McGinnis
11- Ralph Dyer
??- Ed Benedict
42- Lee Petty
8- Gene Comstock
55- Bub King

Raleigh 300 

The thirteenth race of the season was run on May 30 at Raleigh Speedway in Raleigh, North Carolina.  Slick Smith won the pole.

Top ten results

14- Fonty Flock
12- Speedy Thompson
91- Tim Flock
92- Herb Thomas
78- Dick Passwater
120- Dick Rathmann
4- Slick Smith
42- Lee Petty
44- Ray Duhigg
82- Joe Eubanks

1953-14 

The fourteenth race of the season was run on June 7 at the Louisiana Fairgrounds in Shreveport, Louisiana.  Herb Thomas won the pole.

Top ten results

42- Lee Petty
120- Dick Rathmann
92- Herb Thomas
91- Tim Flock
87- Buck Baker
1- Herschel Buchanan
51- Gober Sosebee
11- Ralph Dyer
??- Elbert Allen
4- Slick Smith

1953-15 

The fifteen race of the season was run on June 14 at Five Flags Speedway in Pensacola, Florida. Dick Rathmann won the pole.

Top ten results

92- Herb Thomas
120- Dick Rathmann
42- Lee Petty
87- Buck Baker
91- Tim Flock
78- Dick Passwater
82- Joe Eubanks
4- Slick Smith
51- Gober Sosebee
191- Fred Moore

International 200 

The sixteenth race of the season was run on June 21 at Langhorne Speedway in Langhorne, Pennsylvania.  Lloyd Shaw won the pole.

Top ten results

120- Dick Rathmann
42- Lee Petty
80- Jim Paschal
92- Herb Thomas
2- Bill Blair
15- Dick Allwine
91- Tim Flock
10- Nick Fornono
23- Billy Oswald
60- Bill Rexford

1953-17 

The seventeenth race of the season was run on June 26 at Tri-City Speedway in High Point, North Carolina.  Herb Thomas won the pole.

Top ten results

92- Herb Thomas
120- Dick Rathmann
82- Joe Eubanks
87- Buck Baker
42- Lee Petty
80- Jim Paschal
78- Slick Smith
41- Jimmie Lewallen
??- Buck Smith
34- Andy Winfree

1953-18 

The eighteenth race of the season was run on June 28 at Wilson Speedway in Wilson, North Carolina. Buck Baker earned the pole position for the event.

Top ten results

14- Fonty Flock
120- Dick Rathmann
92- Herb Thomas
82- Joe Eubanks
87- Buck Baker
12- Speedy Thompson
91- Tim Flock
19- Fred Dove
42- Lee Petty
41- Jimmie Lewallen

1953-19 

The nineteenth race of the season was run on July 3 at the Monroe County Fairgrounds in Rochester, New York.  Tim Flock won the pole.

Top ten results

92- Herb Thomas
120- Dick Rathmann
42- Lee Petty
91- Tim Flock
60- Bill Rexford
??- Bob Cameron
??- John Meggers
??- Jerry Earl
??- Russ Truelove
167- Elton Hildreth

1953-20 

The twentieth race of the season was run on July 4 at the Piedmont Interstate Fairgrounds in Spartanburg, South Carolina.  Buck Baker won the pole.

Top ten results

42- Lee Petty
87- Buck Baker
92- Herb Thomas
14- Fonty Flock
58- Johnny Patterson
82- Joe Eubanks
??- Elbert Allen
51- Gober Sosebee
108- Arden Mounts
120- Dick Rathmann

1953-21 

The twenty-first race of the season was run on July 10 at Morristown Speedway in Morristown, New Jersey.  Herb Thomas won the pole.

Top ten results

120- Dick Rathmann
92- Herb Thomas
42- Lee Petty
80- Jim Paschal
53- Ronnie Kohler
??- Eddie Riker
167- Elton Hildreth
??- Charles Barry
??- John Meggers
??- Bill Cleveland

1953-22 

The twenty-second race of the season was run on July 12 at Lakewood Speedway in Atlanta, Georgia.  Herb Thomas won the pole.

Top ten results

92- Herb Thomas
120- Dick Rathmann
42- Lee Petty
82- Joe Eubanks
??- Jerry Wimbish
50- Gober Sosebee
87- Buck Baker
??- Neil Roberts
??- C. H. Dingler
33- Gordon Bracken

1953-23 

The twenty-third race of the season was run on July 22 at Rapid Valley Speedway in Rapid City, South Dakota.  Herb Thomas captured the pole for the event.

Top ten results

92- Herb Thomas
120- Dick Rathmann
14- Fonty Flock
42- Lee Petty
87- Buck Baker
9- Bill Harrison
28- Eddie Skinner
??- Leo Ray
??- Dick Fellows
??- C. H. Dingler

1953-24 

The twenty-fourth race of the season was run on July 26 at the Lincoln City Fairgrounds in North Platte, Nebraska.  Herb Thomas won the pole.

Top ten results

120- Dick Rathmann
92- Herb Thomas
42- Lee Petty
87- Buck Baker
??- Marvin Copple
9- Bill Harrison
??- Byron Clouse
??- C. H. Dingler
??- Tubby Harrison
??- Sandy Slack

1953-25 

The twenty-fifth race of the season was run on August 2 at Davenport Speedway in Davenport, Iowa.  Buck Baker won the pole.

Top ten results

92- Herb Thomas
87- Buck Baker
42- Lee Petty
120- Dick Rathmann
14- Fonty Flock
9- Bill Harrison
??- Mel Krueger
??- Johnny Beauchamp
??- Tubby Harrison
??- Keith Lucas

1953-26 

The twenty-sixth race of the season was run on August 9 at Occoneechee Speedway in Hillsboro, North Carolina.  Curtis Turner won the pole.

Top ten results

41- Curtis Turner
92- Herb Thomas
42- Lee Petty
82- Joe Eubanks
2- Bill Blair
80- Jim Paschal
4- Slick Smith
167- Elton Hildreth
22- Jimmie Lewallen
??- Jimmy Ayers

1953-27 

The twenty-seventh race of the season was run on August 16 at Asheville-Weaverville Speedway in Weaverville, North Carolina.  Curtis Turner won the pole.

Top ten results

14- Fonty Flock
92- Herb Thomas
2- Bill Blair
87- Buck Baker
22- Jimmie Lewallen
4- Slick Smith
42- Lee Petty
8- Gene Comstock
3- Jimmy Ayers
91- Tim Flock

1953-28 

The twenty-eighth race of the season was run on August 23 at Princess Anne Speedway in Norfolk, Virginia.  Curtis Turner captured the pole position.

Top ten results

92- Herb Thomas
14- Fonty Flock
42- Lee Petty
120- Dick Rathmann
80- Jim Paschal
87- Buck Baker
??- Andy Winfree
??- John Meggers
??- Ralph Rose
51- Gober Sosebee

1953-29 

The twenty-ninth race of the season was run on August 29 at Hickory Speedway in Hickory, North Carolina.  Tim Flock won the pole.  This was the first Grand National race for the 1961 and 1965 champion and future NASCAR Hall of Fame member Ned Jarrett.  He finished 11th.

Top ten results

14- Fonty Flock
92- Herb Thomas
82- Joe Eubanks
42- Lee Petty
22- Jimmie Lewallen
4- Slick Smith
91- Tim Flock
19- Fred Dove
??- Ralph Rose
??- Buck Baker

Southern 500 

The thirtieth race of the season was run on September 7 at Darlington Raceway in Darlington, South Carolina. Fonty Flock won the pole.  Buck Baker won the event by three laps.  This race also marked the first Grand National race for future NASCAR Hall of Fame member Junior Johnson.  Johnson finished 38th after being involved in a wreck.

Top ten results

87- Buck Baker
14- Fonty Flock
44- Curtis Turner
49- Dick Meyer
92- Herb Thomas
80- Jim Paschal
46- Speedy Thompson
29- Donald Thomas
00- Dick Passwater
91- Tim Flock

1953-31 

The thirty-first race of the season was run on September 13 at Central City Speedway in Macon, Georgia.  Joe Eubanks won the pole.

Top ten results

12- Speedy Thompson
42- Lee Petty
51- Gober Sosebee
82- Joe Eubanks
91- Tim Flock
92- Herb Thomas
87- Buck Baker
 Bob Walden
4- Slick Smith
34- Andy Winfree

• This was the first of twenty victories for Thompson.

1953-32 

The thirty-second race of the season was run on September 20 at Langhorne Speedway in Langhorne, Pennsylvania.  Herb Thomas won the pole.

Top ten results

120- Dick Rathmann
92- Herb Thomas
46- Speedy Thompson
9 Jim Reed
80- Jim Paschal
42- Lee Petty
41- Curtis Turner
82- Joe Eubanks
22- Jimmie Lewallen
18- Bobby Myers

1953-33 

The thirty-third race of the season was run on October 3 at the Bloomsburg Fairgrounds in Bloomsburg, Pennsylvania.  Jim Paschal won the pole.

Top ten results

92- Herb Thomas
120- Dick Rathmann
87- Buck Baker
167- Elton Hildreth
24- Bob Welborn
42- Lee Petty
93- Ted Chamberlain
??- Bob Walden
??- Wimpy Ervin
??- Ed DeWolff

1953-34 

The thirty-fourth race of the season was run on October 4 at Wilson Speedway in Wilson, North Carolina.  Herb Thomas won the pole.

Top ten results

92- Herb Thomas
46- Speedy Thompson
14- Fonty Flock
42- Lee Petty
45- Ralph Liguori
120- Dick Rathmann
87- Buck Baker
167- Elton Hildreth
22- Jimmie Lewallen
51- Gober Sosebee

Wilkes 160 

The thirty-fifth race of the season was run on October 11 at North Wilkesboro Speedway in North Wilkesboro, North Carolina.  Buck Baker won the pole.

Top ten results

46- Speedy Thompson
17- Fonty Flock
44- Ray Duhigg
24- Bob Welborn
42- Lee Petty
87- Buck Baker
2- Bill Blair
82- Joe Eubanks
22- Jimmie Lewallen
55- Bub King

1953-36 

The thirty-sixth race of the season was run on October 13 at Martinsville Speedway in Martinsville, Virginia.  Fonty Flock won the pole.

Top ten results

80- Jim Paschal
42- Lee Petty
2- Bill Blair
42- Fonty Flock
??- Carl Burris
13- Emory Lewis
24- Bob Welborn
??- Bill Morgan
??- Clyde Minter
111- Joe Bill O'Dell

•Pascal’s win was the first of 25 wins over a 23 year career.

1953-37 

The thirty-seventh and final race of the season was run on November 1 at Lakewood Speedway in Atlanta, Georgia.  Tim Flock started on the pole but finished 20th due to an overheating problem.  Herb Thomas, the 1953 champion, finished 14th.

Top ten results

87- Buck Baker
14- Fonty Flock
42- Lee Petty
80- Jim Paschal
22- Jimmie Lewallen
58- Johnny Patterson
13- Pop McGinnis
82- Joe Eubanks
25- Bob Welborn
??- Ewell Weddle

Final points standings top twenty 

 Herb Thomas – 8460
 Lee Petty – 7814
 Dick Rathmann – 7362
 Buck Baker – 6713
 Fonty Flock – 6174
 Tim Flock – 5011
 Jim Paschal – 4211
 Joe Eubanks – 3603
 Jimmie Lewallen – 3208
 Curtis Turner – 3373
 Speedy Thompson – 2958
 Slick Smith – 2670
 Elton Hildreth – 2625
 Gober Sosebee – 2525
 Bill Blair – 2457
 Fred Dove – 1997
 Bub King – 1624
 Gene Comstock – 1519
 Donald Thomas – 1408
 Ralph Liguori – 1336

References 

 
NASCAR Cup Series seasons